Namaquarachne is a genus of South African araneomorph spiders in the family Phyxelididae, and was first described by C. E. Griswold in 1990.

Species
 it contains five species, found only in South Africa:
Namaquarachne angulata Griswold, 1990 – South Africa
Namaquarachne hottentotta (Pocock, 1900) – South Africa
Namaquarachne khoikhoiana Griswold, 1990 (type) – South Africa
Namaquarachne thaumatula Griswold, 1990 – South Africa
Namaquarachne tropata Griswold, 1990 – South Africa

See also
 List of Phyxelididae species

References

Endemic fauna of South Africa
Araneomorphae genera
Phyxelididae
Spiders of South Africa